Brigadier-General Anthony John Abdy, CB, CBE (26 April 1856 – 4 July 1924) was a British Army officer and first-class cricketer. He was a right-handed batsman who played for Hampshire.

Military career
Abdy was born in Cambridge, the son of John Thomas Abdy, Regis Professor of Law at Cambridge and a County Court Judge. He was educated at Charterhouse School and commissioned a lieutenant in the Royal Artillery in 1876.

He was promoted captain on 5 December 1884, major on 22 July 1893, and lieutenant colonel on 29 November 1900. From 1899 to 1900, he served in South Africa during the Second Boer War: he was "slightly wounded" and was awarded the Queen's South Africa Medal with clasp. In February 1902 he received a temporary staff appointment as Deputy-Assistant Quartermaster General for military intelligence at Army Headquarters.

Abdy returned to South Africa, and commanded the Royal Horse Artillery and the Royal Field Artillery in the country between 1908 and 1912. He was later promoted to brigadier general, and served in the First World War.

Cricket
Abdy, who played for Essex prior to their entrance into first-class cricket, made his only first-class appearance during the 1881 season, for Hampshire against Marylebone Cricket Club. From the opening order, Abdy scored 7 runs in the first innings in which he batted, and 23 runs in the second.
He became a notable Army cricketer with the Royal Artillery, Southern Division.

Abdy's brother-in-law Lothian Bonham-Carter, and nephews Stuart and Algernon Bonham-Carter, were also cricketers and distant relatives of the actress Helena Bonham Carter.

References

Gazetted as Colonel (temporary Brigadier-General), 1914

External links
Anthony Abdy at CricketArchive
Anthony Adby at Cricinfo

1856 births
1924 deaths
Cricketers from Cambridgeshire
Military personnel from Cambridgeshire
British Army personnel of the Second Boer War
British Army generals of World War I
English cricketers
Hampshire cricketers
Sportspeople from Cambridge
People educated at Charterhouse School
British Army brigadiers
Royal Artillery officers